Monitor is an unincorporated community located in Trimble County, Kentucky, United States.
Monitor was once a vibrant community, with a school, post office, general store, and black smith in the early 1900s.

References

Unincorporated communities in Trimble County, Kentucky
Unincorporated communities in Kentucky